Delfino may refer to:

Surname 
 Alejandro Delfino (born 1962), original name of Alex To, Hong Kong singer and actor
 Carlos Delfino (born 1982), Argentine professional basketball player
 Daniel Delfino (born 1970), Argentine former professional association football player
 Frank Delfino (1911–1997), American actor
 Frank Delfino, fictional character played by Charlie Weber (List of How to Get Away with Murder characters)
 Giuseppe Delfino (1921–1999), Italian fencer
 Jean-Paul Delfino (born 1964), French author
 Jessica Delfino (born 1976), American singer, songwriter and comedian
 Majandra Delfino (born 1981), Venezuelan-born American actress and singer
 Mariano Delfino (born 1977), Argentine former professional tennis player
 Mike Delfino, fictional character on Desperate Housewives

Given name 
 Delfino Borroni (1898–2008), Italian supercentenarian
 Delfino Codazzi (1824–1873), Italian mathematician

Italian masculine given names
Spanish masculine given names